Pucón Airport is an airport  east of Pucón, a city on the eastern shore of Villarrica Lake in the Araucanía Region of Chile.

The airport can handle aircraft up to the Boeing 737 in size and operates seasonal flights from Santiago de Chile. Travel options vary between high and low tourist season.

There is mountainous terrain north and south of the runway.

See also

Transport in Chile
List of airports in Chile

References

External links
Pucón Airport at OpenStreetMap

Aeródromo Pucón (SCPC) at Aerodromo.cl

Airports in Chile
Airports in La Araucanía Region